The Protyre 2010 Formula Renault BARC season was the 16th Formula Renault BARC Championship. The season began at Brands Hatch on 18 April and ended on 17 October at Thruxton, after twelve rounds held in England. Making its debut in the series was the previous-specification Formula Renault UK car which ran alongside the existing BARC car in a one-class Championship.

Hillspeed driver Alice Powell became the first female driver to win any Formula Renault championship after overhauling a 16-point deficit to rival Mitchell Hale of Fortec Motorsport at the season's final meeting at Thruxton. Powell won two races at Silverstone and Thruxton with five second places compared to Hale's three victories at Brands Hatch, Silverstone and Snetterton. Third place was also resolved at the final round of the season between Powell's teammate James Theodore and Josh Webster, who started the season as Hale's teammate but took part in the final meeting for Welch Motorsport. Theodore, a race-winner at Croft, Rockingham and Thruxton, got the better of Webster by three points, after he finished ahead of Webster in the final race of the season. Other race wins were taken by Joseph Reilly at Snetterton and Rockingham, Luke Wright at Croft, and Euan Hankey in a one-off appearance at Brands Hatch.

Teams and drivers

Calendar
The series formed part of the BARC club racing meetings. All races held in England.

Standings

Formula Renault Winter Series

References

External links
 The official website of the Formula Renault UK Championship

BARC
Formula Renault BARC season
Renault BARC